David Graham (born 11 July 1925) is an English retired actor. He is best known for voicing the Daleks in Doctor Who, Gordon Tracy, Brains, Aloysius Parker and Kyrano in Thunderbirds and Grandpa Pig in Peppa Pig. He played the role of Big Brother in the "1984" television Super Bowl advert to introduce the Apple Macintosh computer.

Life and career
Graham was born in London in July 1925 and trained as an actor in New York City following service in the Royal Air Force as a radar mechanic.

He played several characters in the science-fiction TV series Doctor Who during the 1960s and 1970s, most notably Dalek voices in the serials The Daleks (1963–1964), The Dalek Invasion of Earth (1964), The Chase (1965; in which he also provided Mechanoid voices) and The Daleks' Master Plan (1965–1966). He performed in person as barman Charlie in The Gunfighters (1966) and as time-travel scientist Professor Kerensky in City of Death (1979). In 2017, Graham voiced the character Percy Till in the Big Finish Doctor Who audio story Static.

Graham provided the regular voices of Gordon Tracy, Brains, Parker and Kyrano for the Supermarionation TV series Thunderbirds (1965–66), as well as its film sequels: Thunderbirds Are Go (1966) and Thunderbird 6 (1968). In the same franchise, he also voiced Brains's robot assistant, Braman (a minor recurring character). Other credits from his association with Thunderbirds producer Gerry Anderson include Four Feather Falls (1960), Supercar (1961–62), Fireball XL5 (1962–63), Stingray (1964–65) and The Secret Service (1969).

He also appeared in Callan, Timeslip, So Haunt Me, Danger Man, The Saint, Howards' Way, Softly, Softly, Armchair Thriller, Ace of Wands, Justice, The Regiment, The Bill, The Fixer, The Sentimental Agent and The Avengers (in the 1963 episode "Man in the Mirror"). He contributed puppet voices to two episodes of The Tomorrow People. He also guest starred in the second series of the 1970s drama When the Boat Comes In and later had a recurring role in the fourth series of the show as "Morty Black", the American Businessman and friend of the main character Jack Ford, played by James Bolam.

In the "1984" television Super Bowl advert, filmed in 1983 to introduce the Apple Macintosh computer, Graham played the role of Big Brother. His other voice work includes the animated children's TV series Moomin and Dominion: Tank Police. More recently, Graham provided the voices of Grandpa in Peppa Pig and Wise Old Elf in Ben and Holly's Little Kingdom. He reprised the voices of Parker and (later) Braman in Thunderbirds Are Go, the 2015 remake of Thunderbirds, which was broadcast early 2015 in the UK. In February 2013, Graham was interviewed by Paddy O'Connell for BBC Radio 2 about his role as one of the early voices of the Daleks, following the death of the Dalek designer Raymond Cusick.

In April 2021, Graham announced his retirement as an actor and voice artist. In December, actor George Layton, a longtime friend of Graham's, announced on Twitter that Graham had suffered a stroke six months earlier and was unable to leave his home in London. However, Layton stated that Graham was recovering by performing voice-overs of his characters.

Selected TV and filmography
 Danger Within (1959) – Lt. Moxhay
 Trouble with Eve (1960) – Car Driver (uncredited)
 Crossroads to Crime (1960) – Johnny
 K.I.L. 1 (1962) – Alvero Belda
 Thunderbirds (1965–1966) – Gordon Tracy / Brains / Parker / Kyrano (voice)
 Doctor Who (1963–1979) – Daleks / Charlie / Kerensky
 Dr. Who and the Daleks (1965) – Daleks (voice, uncredited)
 The Pleasure Girls (1965) – 1st Gambler
 Daleks' Invasion Earth 2150 A.D. (1966) – Daleks (voice, uncredited)
 Thunderbirds Are GO (1966) – Gordon Tracy / Brains / Aloysius Parker (voice)
 Thunderbird 6 (1968) – Gordon Tracy / Brains / Aloysius Parker / Kyrano / Indian Stall-Keeper (voice)
 Freelance (1971) – General
 Callan (1974) – Wireless operator
 Tenebrae (1982) – Det. Germani (English version, voice, uncredited)
 Terrahawks (1983) – Professor Otto Mattix / Elias Crick (voice)
 Supergirl (1984) – Party Guest
 King David (1985) – Ephraimite Elder
 Moomin (1990–1991) – Snork (English version, voice)
 Leon the Pig Farmer (1992) – The Chef
 Asterix & Obelix Take On Caesar (1999) – (voice, uncredited)
 Wild Flowers (1999) – Trip
 Peppa Pig (2004–2021) – Grandpa Pig / Mr. Zebra the Postman (voice)
 Peppa Pig: Flying a Kite and Other Stories (2005) – Grandpa Pig
 Ben and Holly's Little Kingdom (2009–2013) – Wise Old Elf / The Gnome (voice)
 Thunderbirds Are Go  (2015–2020) – Parker (voice) / Braman (voice)

References

External links
 

1925 births
Living people
Apple Inc. advertising
British expatriates in the United States
English male film actors
English male television actors
English male voice actors
Male actors from London
20th-century English male actors
21st-century English male actors
20th-century Royal Air Force personnel